Camborne is an unincorporated place and dispersed rural community in Hamilton Township, Northumberland County in Central Ontario, Canada. The village has a population of approximately 350.

Camborne was settled by United Empire Loyalists and immigrants, primarily from the United Kingdom, in the early- and mid-19th century. It was established as a rural, agricultural community.

The municipal office for the Township of Hamilton is located in Camborne. Camborne Public School, a junior elementary school that is part of the Kawartha Pine Ridge District School Board, is also located in the village, and the original one-room school is maintained as an active community centre and historic site.

References 

Communities in Northumberland County, Ontario